Herald Harbor is a census-designated place and an unincorporated community in Anne Arundel County, Maryland,  United States. As of the 2010 census, the population was 2,603. It is a quiet residential area with a scenic view of the Severn River and is near the community of Crownsville and Interstate 97. Herald Harbor is known for its area immediately along the Severn River known as Long Point on the Severn, a fairly affluent neighborhood composed mainly of retired and wealthy land owners.

Geography
Herald Harbor is located at  (39.051260, −76.574960).

The name "Herald Harbor" is originally derived from a Washington, D.C. newspaper, the Washington Herald, which promoted its subscriptions by giving away small plots of land in the area for summer homes.

Demographics

As of the census of 2000, there were 2,313 people, 941 households, and 641 families residing in the CDP. The racial makeup of the CDP was 96.97% White, 0.65% African American, 0.30% Native American, 0.82% Asian, 0.04% Pacific Islander, 0.17% from other races, and 1.04% from two or more races. Hispanic or Latino of any race were 1.25% of the population.

There were 941 households, out of which 28.6% had children under the age of 18 living with them, 58.8% were married couples living together, 6.3% had a female householder with no husband present, and 31.8% were non-families. 22.0% of all households were made up of individuals, and 4.3% had someone living alone who was 65 years of age or older. The average household size was 2.46 and the average family size was 2.90.

In the CDP, the population was spread out, with 21.1% under the age of 18, 6.1% from 18 to 24, 34.5% from 25 to 44, 30.3% from 45 to 64, and 8.0% who were 65 years of age or older. The median age was 39 years. For every 100 females, there were 105.6 males. For every 100 females age 18 and over, there were 101.8 males.

The median income for a household in the CDP was $73,893, and the median income for a family was $83,812. Males had a median income of $55,000 versus $28,684 for females. The per capita income for the CDP was $34,189. About 4.1% of families and 5.9% of the population were below the poverty line, including 10.3% of those under age 18 and none of those age 65 or over.

References

Census-designated places in Maryland
Census-designated places in Anne Arundel County, Maryland